Tuhalaane is a village in Mulgi Parish in Viljandi County in southern Estonia. It borders the villages Hirmuküla, Morna, Muri and Suuga as well as Viljandi Parish.

Notable people
Ants Piip (1884–1942), politician and diplomat
Jaan Tomp (1894–1924), communist party official and politician
Juhan Muks (1899-1983), painter
Kaarel Pürg (born 1949), politician
Jaan Kiivit Sr. (1906-1971), Lutheran archbishop

References

Villages in Viljandi County
Kreis Fellin